Charlotte Lucy Cleverley-Bisman (born 24 November 2003) is a New Zealander known as the face of a New Zealand campaign to encourage vaccination against meningococcal disease after contracting and surviving severe meningococcal sepsis. She was nicknamed "Miraculous Baby Charlotte" by her fellow New Zealanders as a result of making headlines worldwide after recuperating from a series of life-threatening complications. She is the daughter of Pam Cleverley and Perry Bisman.

Meningococcal disease in New Zealand 

In 2004, New Zealand was in the thirteenth year of an epidemic of meningococcal disease, a bacterial infection which can cause meningitis and blood poisoning. Most Western countries have fewer than three cases for every 100,000 people each year, with New Zealand averaging 1.5 before the epidemic started in 1991; in 2001, the worst year of the epidemic in New Zealand, the rate hit 17. 5,400 New Zealanders had caught the disease, 220 had died, and 1080 had developed serious disabilities, such as limb amputations or brain damage. Eight out of ten cases were under 20 and half were under 5 years of age. The internationally low proportion of deaths from the disease had been credited to wide publicity of the disease and its symptoms. In June 2004, Charlotte Cleverley-Bisman became the face of the epidemic.

Disease onset 

The morning of 17 June 2004, Cleverley-Bisman vomited and was unhappy, but the parents took it as anticipated teething pains. By mid-morning she developed a small blemish on her neck, and her mother rushed her to Waiheke Ostend Medical Centre, where staff diagnosed meningococcemia. In ten minutes she was covered with small spots. She was injected with penicillin, and rushed to Starship Children's Health by helicopter. Half an hour after the first spots were noticed, she was blistered, swollen, and purple over her entire body, with her extremities blackening. She was not expected to survive, and needed to be resuscitated twice during her first half-hour at Starship. She was connected to life support systems which fed her, transfused blood and drugs, and assisted her breathing.

On the second day, Starship doctors said that if she lived at all, Cleverley-Bisman would need to have at least both legs and most of her left hand amputated in order to save her life from gangrene. During the three weeks while doctors waited for demarcation between dead and living flesh to become clearer, her catheters became clogged several times and needed to be replaced with additional surgery. By the end of June, it was clear that all four limbs would need to be amputated. This was done on 2 July, amputating both legs and left arm "optimistically", through the knee joints, rather than above them, hoping to preserve the growth plates at the end of the long bones, which would allow for better use of prosthetics later in life.

Cleverley-Bisman's parents helped the case to be publicised nationwide to raise parents' awareness of the speed of the disease, and to highlight the need for a vaccine. Charitable donors gave money to defray their expenses, beginning with NZ$1000 from the Jassy Dean Trust, set up in 1992 after another girl died from meningococcal disease.

Recovery 

After two and a half months at Starship Hospital, Cleverley-Bisman was well enough to move to the Wilson Home in Takapuna, North Shore City, for three months of rehabilitation. Wriggling had kept her muscles relatively fit; she was able to roll over, and even put a cup to her mouth without the use of prosthetics. She returned to her home in Waiheke in November, just in time to celebrate her first birthday.

As part of her rehabilitation process, she played with toys and exercised on a daily basis. She took her first solo steps using prosthetic legs and crutches in September 2008, and no longer needed crutches by October 2009.

In December 2008, then aged five, Charlotte won TVNZ's inaugural Attitude Spirit award.

Later life
By 2010, Charlotte had outgrown her prosthetic limbs and the family made a plea for help. In August 2011, Charlotte and her parents made a fourth trip to Camp No Limits, a camp for children with limb loss that also includes the parents, where she received physical therapy and learned to walk on new limbs. According to The New Zealand Herald the father stated that "the process would be an annual event, given Charlotte is still growing and therefore growing out of her prosthetics in a matter of a few months."

During her 2013 stay at Camp No Limits, Charlotte mentored other young meningitis amputees.  By the age of 13, Charlotte took up several sports, such as surfing, skydiving and boxing.

Public awareness and support
During Cleverley-Bisman's hospital stay, donors had given hundreds of gifts and around NZ$60,000 for her care; however, expenses were such that this would last less than a year. Following her hospitalisation, a trust was set up in her name. The primary mission of the trust was to provide for Cleverley-Bisman's life necessities, and the secondary goal of the foundation is to increase awareness of meningitis/meningococcal disease.

Cleverley-Bisman's illness and the surrounding interest generated much exposure of the issue of immunisation for meningococcal disease, and her case has been cited as helping spur immunisation drives. As a result of her case, her father has helped publicise the availability of vaccination to help ensure that as many people are vaccinated as possible.

References

External links 
 
 Vaccine campaign beating meningococcal epidemic, 3 July 2006

2003 births
Living people
New Zealand amputees
New Zealand children
Quadruple amputees
People from Auckland